is a manga by Osamu Tezuka that began serialization in 1952.

Plot

In the year 19XX, a new celestial body has been discovered in the same orbit as Earth.  Dubbed "Planet Deimon" after its discoverer, Doctor Deimon, the planet's orbit soon slows, coming into close proximity with Earth.  After a severe storm, the planet becomes Earth's second satellite.

Doctor Deimon's son, Rock, organizes an expedition to explore the new planet and discovers that there are two races of sentient beings living on Deimon.  The "Epumu", a race of avian people with the ability to fly, and the "Ruboroom", a race of metamorphic clay men who are slaves to the "Epumu".

After his first journey to Deimon, Rock adopts a baby "Epumu" chick named "Chiko" and raises him, learning more about Deimon culture and the differences between human and "Epumu" civilization.  However, as the conflict between the people of Earth and the people of Deimon escalate, Rock becomes the ambassador for the two worlds and attempts to find a way to bring peace to everyone.

Characters
Rock as himself
Daisuke
Mirum
Tonanshipei as himself
Chiko
Higeoyaji as himself

See also
List of Osamu Tezuka manga
Osamu Tezuka's Star System

References

External links
The Adventure of Rock at TezukaOsamu.Net
Online Watch Anime

1952 manga
Adventure anime and manga
Kodansha manga
Osamu Tezuka manga
Shōnen manga